"How's This?" (Hangul: 어때?; RR: eottae?) is song recorded by South Korean singer-songwriter and rapper Hyuna. It is the lead single of her fifth extended play, A'wesome, released on August 1, 2016. It was written by Hyuna, Big Sancho and Seo Jaewoo, being produced by the last. The singer performed the song on several South Korean music programs, including M Countdown and Inkigayo, where she also won a music show award on each.

The song peaked at number 5 on the Gaon Digital Chart and at number 4 on the US World Digital Chart.

Background and release
"How's This?" was written by Hyuna, Big Sancho and Seo Jae-woo and produced by Jae-woo. The song was described by Fuse's Jeff Benjamin as "a typical club banger" that "moves through different genres and vocal deliveries over a pounding beat".

Music video
A music video for "How's This?" was  released on August 1, and was directed by Hong Won-ki of Zanybros. The video is set in a club party, which featured one-hundred dancers. "How's This?" topped multiple real-time music charts upon its release, and the accompanying music video reached more than 2 million views within 24 hours.

Accolades

Charts
The song debuted at number 5 on the Gaon Digital Chart, on the chart issue dated July 31 - August 6, 2016, with 102,587 downloads sold and 2,201,140 streams. The song also debuted at number 16 on the chart for the month of August 2016, with 190,625 downloads sold and 7,372,262 streams accumulated.

References

	

2016 singles
Korean-language songs
Hyuna songs
Cube Entertainment singles
2016 songs
Songs written by Hyuna